Étienne Onimus (1 January 1907 – 3 January 1982) was a French basketball player. He competed in the men's tournament at the 1936 Summer Olympics.

References

External links
 

1907 births
1982 deaths
French men's basketball players
Olympic basketball players of France
Basketball players at the 1936 Summer Olympics
Sportspeople from Mulhouse